Model A may refer to:

 Ford Model A (1927–31), a model of car built by the Ford Motor Company
 Ford Model A (1903–04), a model of car built by the Ford Motor Company
 One of the letter-series models of Farmall tractors
 John Deere Model A, a model of John Deere tractor build by Deere & Company
 A structural model of personality in Socionics
 A character mode in the video game Mega Man ZX Advent
 Chu Hummingbird Model A, an experimental co-axial helicopter
 Ritz Model A, ultralight aircraft
 Wright Model A, an early aircraft

See also
 Class A (disambiguation)
 Type A (disambiguation)